Gabriel Palmeros Valadéz (born December 2, 1977 in Puebla, Puebla) is a former Mexican football (soccer) defender. He played for Santos Laguna (2001–2005) and Jaguares de Chiapas (2005–2007).

Career
Born in Puebla, Puebla, Palmeros' family moved to Comarca Lagunera when he was very young. He began playing football with local side Santos Laguna, where he would make his Liga MX debut.

References

1977 births
Living people
Mexican footballers
Santos Laguna footballers
Association football defenders
People from Puebla (city)
Chiapas F.C. footballers